Shangmei Subdistrict is a subdistrict and the seat of Xinhua County in Hunan, China. The subdistrict was incorporated from part of the former Shangmei Town on November 6, 2017. The subdistrict has 11 villages and 16 communities under its jurisdiction, its seat is at Yingbin Road.

Subdivisions 
Shangmei Subdistrict has 11 villages and 15 communities under its jurisdiction, as of its creation in 2017.

15 communities
 Beita Community
 Chongyangling Community
 Dongwai Community
 Fujingshan Community
 Gongnong Community
 Gongnonghe Community
 Lixinqiao Community
 Meishu Community
 Paomaling Community
 Pingshanlong Community
 Qingshijie Community
 Shizijie Community
 Yongxing Community
 Yuanzhuling Community
 Yuxugong Community
11 villages
 Beidu Village
 Hexing Village
 Hongqixincun Village
 Hongxing Village
 Huashan Village
 Huayuan Village from Youjia Town
 Jiangxi Village from Ketou Township
 Jizhong Village
 Maojialong Village
 Xiatian Village
 Xindu Village

References

Divisions of Xinhua County